SS Regina was a tanker built in Belfast in 1904 that sank on March 8, 1940, near Bradenton Beach, United States. Her wreck is located in the Gulf of Mexico, 75 yards (69 meters) off Bradenton Beach. In April 2005, the wreck became the tenth Florida Underwater Archaeological Preserve. On December 6, 2005, it was added to the United States National Register of Historic Places.

References

External links
 The Underwater Archaeological Preserves
 Regina
 Original Regina Underwater Archaeological Preserve Proposal (pdf or MS Word format)
 Museums in the Sea Regina

National Register of Historic Places in Manatee County, Florida
Shipwrecks of the Florida coast
Maritime incidents in March 1940
Shipwrecks on the National Register of Historic Places in Florida
Ships built in Belfast
1904 ships
Florida Underwater Archaeological Preserves